Population censuses in Greece take place the first year of every decade. There have been 28 censuses in the history of modern Greece, conducted in various times, starting from 1828 at the end of the Greek War of Independence.

See also
Demographic history of Greece

References

History of modern Greece
Society of Greece
Greece
Demographics of Greece